Eupalamides guyanensis is a moth in the Castniidae family. It is widely distributed in northern South America, from Venezuela to Guyana, Colombia and Brazil (Pará).

The wingspan is 150–180 mm. Adults are dark brown with an olive-green hue. There is a creamy band on the forewing, running from the costal margin to the inner angle. There are also five to six creamy spots forming a semicircular band at the apical region. On the hindwings, two rows of seven to eight creamy spots are found, located parallel to the posterior
margin.

The larvae feed on Cocos nucifera and are considered a pest. They have also been recorded on Attalea species. They bore galleries at the apical zone of the trunk and at the leaf base. Pupation takes place in a cocoon made of plant fibers which is located between the petiole and trunk of the host plant. They are long, thick and cream coloured.

References 

Moths described in 1917
Castniidae